As of 2018, American actress Emma Stone has won 31 awards from over 91 nominations. She has been nominated for two AACTA International Awards, three Academy Awards, and four British Academy Film Awards, winning one from each. She has also won a Golden Globe Award, two MTV Movie Awards, a People's Choice Award, three Screen Actors Guild Awards, and three Teen Choice Awards. Additionally, she has won six critic association awards, and was named runner-up for five others.

Stone began her acting career with a role in a theater production of The Wind in the Willows in 2000. She won the Young Hollywood Award for Exciting New Face for her debut film—the teen comedy Superbad (2007), which had her play a high school student. For the role of a zombie apocalypse survivor and a con-artist in the horror comedy film Zombieland, she received a nomination for the Teen Choice Award for Choice Movie Actress – Comedy, and garnered a Best Ensemble award and Best Horror Actress nomination at the 2010 Scream Awards.

Stone had her breakthrough with her first leading role in Easy A (2010), a teen comedy which saw her play a high school student perceived to be sexually promiscuous. She was nominated for BAFTA Rising Star Award and Golden Globe Award for Best Actress in a Musical or Comedy, and won the MTV Movie Award for Best Comedic Performance. Her role was also included in Time list of "Top 10 Everything of 2010".

Stone played a supporting role in the 2011 romantic comedy-drama Crazy, Stupid, Love, for which she was awarded the Teen Choice Award for Choice Movie Actress – Comedy. Further success came with the critically acclaimed drama The Help (2011), in which she played an aspiring writer learning about the lives of the African-American maids. The film won Best Ensemble Cast from Women Film Critics Circle, Broadcast Film Critics Association, and Screen Actors Guild Awards; she was nominated for the Teen Choice Awards for Choice Movie Actress – Drama. For portraying Gwen Stacy in The Amazing Spider-Man (2012), she was nominated for the People's Choice Award for Favorite Movie Actress and the Teen Choice Award for Choice Female Movie Star of the Summer.

The role of a recovering drug addict in the black comedy-drama Birdman (2014) earned Stone nominations for the Academy Award, BAFTA Award, Golden Globe Award, and Screen Actors Guild Award for Best Supporting Actress, and MTV Movie Award for Best Performance. She also won the Boston Society of Film Critics Award for Best Supporting Actress for the film. Stone won the Academy Award for Best Actress, BAFTA Award, Golden Globe Award, and Volpi Cup for Best Actress for playing an aspiring actress in the musical La La Land (2016). Her portrayal of Abigail Masham, Baroness Masham, in The Favourite (2018), earned her second Best Supporting Actress nominations for an Academy Award, Golden Globe, Screen Actors Guild, and BAFTA Awards.

Major associations

Academy Awards 
The Academy Awards, commonly known as the "Oscars", are a set of 24 awards given by the Academy of Motion Picture Arts and Sciences annually for excellence of cinematic achievements.

BAFTA Awards 
The BAFTA Award is an annual award show presented by the British Academy of Film and Television Arts.

Golden Globe Awards 
The Golden Globe Award is an accolade bestowed by the 93 members of the Hollywood Foreign Press Association (HFPA) recognizing excellence in film and television, both domestic and foreign.

Screen Actors Guild Awards 
The Screen Actors Guild Awards are organized by the Screen Actors Guild‐American Federation of Television and Radio Artists. First awarded in 1995, the awards aim to recognize excellent achievements in film and television.

Venice Film Festival 
The Venice Film Festival is the oldest film festival in the world, and one of the "Big Three" film festivals, alongside the Cannes Film Festival and Berlin International Film Festival.

Other awards and nominations

Australian Academy of Cinema and Television Arts Awards 
The AACTA Awards are presented annually by the Australian Academy of Cinema and Television Arts (AACTA) to recognize and honor achievements in the film and television industry.

British Independent Film Awards 
The British Independent Film Awards honor British independent cinema and film-making talent in the United Kingdom.

Comedy Awards 
The Comedy Awards, run by the American television network Comedy Central, honored the best of comedy.

Critics' Choice Awards

Gotham Awards

Hollywood Film Awards 
The Hollywood Film Awards are held annually to recognize talent in the film industry.

Independent Spirit Awards 
The Independent Spirit Awards are presented annually by Film Independent, to award best in the independent film community.

MTV Movie & TV Awards 
The MTV Movie & TV Awards is an annual award show presented by MTV to honor outstanding achievements in films. Founded in 1992, the winners of the awards are decided online by the audience.

National Board of Review Awards 
The National Board of Review Award was founded in 1909 in New York City to recognize "film, domestic and foreign, as both art and entertainment".

NAACP Image Awards 
The NAACP Image Award is annually presented to people of color in film, television, music, and literature.

NewNowNext Awards 
The NewNowNext Award is an annual awards show, held by the gay- and lesbian-themed network Logo.

Nickelodeon Kids' Choice Awards 
The Nickelodeon Kids' Choice Awards, also known as the Kids Choice Awards (KCAs), is an annual awards show that airs on the Nickelodeon cable channel that honors the year's biggest television, film, and music acts, as voted by Nickelodeon viewers.

People's Choice Awards 
The People's Choice Awards is an American awards show recognizing the people and the work of popular culture. The show has been held annually since 1975, and is voted on by the general public.

Producers Guild Awards

Santa Barbara International Film Festival 
The Santa Barbara International Film Festival is an eleven-day film festival held in Santa Barbara, California.

Satellite Awards 
The Satellite Awards are a set of annual awards given by the International Press Academy.

Saturn Awards 
The Saturn Awards are presented annually by the Academy of Science Fiction, Fantasy, and Horror Films to honor science fiction, fantasy, and horror films, television, and home video.

Scream Awards 
The Scream Awards are held annually to recognize films in the horror, science fiction, and fantasy genre.

Spike Awards 
The Spike Guys' Choice Awards and Spike Video Game Awards are annually held by television channel Spike.

Spike Guys' Choice Awards

Spike Video Game Awards

Teen Choice Awards 
The Teen Choice Awards is an annual awards show that airs on the Fox Network. The awards honor the year's biggest achievements in music, movies, sports, television, fashion, and other categories, voted by teen viewers.

Young Hollywood Awards 
The Young Hollywood Awards honor young people's achievements in music, film, sports, television, and sports.

Critics associations awards

See also
 List of Emma Stone performances

References

Stone, Emma
Awards